UBERMORGEN.COM is a Swiss-Austrian-American artist duo founded in 1995 and consisting of lizvlx and Luzius Bernhard. They live and work in Vienna, Basel, S-chanf near St. Moritz and in Cologne, where both are professors at the Academy of Media Arts (KHM).

Work 
Their main body of work consists of internet art/net.art, installation, video art, photography, software art, performance and uses the convergence of digital media to produce and publish online and offline.

Their early works were media hacking projects using low-tech tools to reach very large audiences. During the work on their best known project Voteauction (2000) CNN.com called them "Maverick Austrian Businessmen". The project resulted in an onslaught of lawsuits issued by Illinois, Texas, Arizona, California, Missouri, Massachusetts, and Wisconsin. 

In 2001, they started a collaboration with Christoph Schlingensief for the development and staging of a Hamlet project in Zurich: NAZI~LINE, a bigger than life fake neo-Nazi helpline and exit strategy finding agency.

In 2005 they started the EKMRZ Trilogy, a series of conceptual hacks (GWEI – Google Will Eat Itself, Amazon Noir and The Sound of eBay).

Between 2007–2011 their focus went into research-based productions (Superenhanced, WOPPOW, KRAFT Series) and Rock Art productions such as TORTURE CLASSICS and CLICKISTAN (commissioned by the Whitney Museum of American Art). They started to work extensively with video during this period.

Since 1999 their work has been shown in museums and galleries in Europe, America, Africa, Australia and Asia and include venues such as SFMOMA, Centre Pompidou, Konsthall Malmoe, NTT ICC Museum Tokyo, Gwangju Design Biennale, ZKM Karlsruhe, MUMOK Vienna, Ars Electronica Linz, WRO Media Art Biennale Wroclaw, MoCA Taipei, Witte de With Rotterdam, Lentos Art Museum Linz, Biennale of Sydney, ARCO Madrid and the New Museum New York.

They have been represented by Fabio Paris Brescia, [DAM] Berlin and Carroll / Fletcher London.

Injunction generator
The Injunction Generator is an artistic software module by Ubermorgen which claims to generate on request legal injunctions and personalized documentation in .rtf/.pdf format to force a website into taking its contents offline. 

Carrying on with their principles of "radical corporative marketing strategy" (media hacking), the artists produced an effective and credible interface which helps creating one's own documented cease-and-desist request, which is then automatically sent to the DNS administrators, to the site's owner and to some journalists to trick them into supporting the "public trial". 

The project is published at ipnic.org, an acronym which mimics the official protocols (Internet Protocol - Network Information Center), revisited as "Internet Partnership for No Internet Content". 

This sarcastic provocation (a "public shutdown service") was conceived after experiencing a similar mishap during the Voteauction art project, which in 2000 invited American citizens to put up their vote for auction. At the time an email injunction by an American court was sent to the Swiss internet service provider hosting the site, who immediately took them offline even though emailed documents aren't legally considered official and even though Switzerland is outside of American jurisdiction.

Life and career

Lizvlx and Luzius Bernhard are an artist duo but also a couple in private life. They are engaged and have two children, Billie-Ada (2003) and Lola Mae (2007).

Lizvlx was born in Linz (AT) and grew up in Wels, Salzburg and Elmira (Upstate New York). Luzius Bernhard was born at the Yale University Hospital in New Haven (USA), grew up in New Haven and Basel (CH) and moved to Vienna (AT) to study with Prof. Peter Weibel, and later on with Prof. Lev Manovich (UCSD), Prof. Peter Lunenfeld (Art Center College of Design) Pasadena and Prof. Bazon Brock (emeritus) :de:Bazon Brock (Wuppertal) and completed his studies in 1999.

Due to his drug abuse and a manic episode in Cape Town 2002, Luzius Bernhard was diagnosed bipolar.

Their earliest works were part of the avantgarde Net.art movement (etoy, 1994–1998, 194.152.164.137, 1996) and were exclusively shown online (World Wide Web/WWW). This work became part of the Internet art and Digital art history and is researched at universities (dissertations, thesis) and taught in (Art history).

The collaboration with both their children (Superenhanced & Spielendes Baby – Schlafendes Baby (original title)), the inclusion of Luzius's mental illness and the merger of private and public life led some critics and academics to consider UBERMORGEN.COM as a Gesamtkunstwerk.

Important personal and artistic influences were early meetings with Jean Tinguely, Joseph Beuys, Daniel Spoerri and Eberhard W. Kornfeld in the Basel art scene of the 1980s and with Niki de Saint Phalle in St. Moritz, and the long-time relationship (going back to 1916 during the first world war and the purchase of a Giovanni Giacometti painting by the grand-grandfather of Luzius Bernhard) with the Giacometti family (Giovanni Giacometti, Alberto Giacometti) in the nearby mountain valleys Val Bregaglia and Engadin in the canton Grisons in Switzerland.

Network
Over the last 15 years UBERMORGEN.COM has been part of the global contemporary technology art scene. Some mentionable connections and collaborations from this period: Net.Artists Alexei Shulgin, Heath Bunting, Olia Lialina, Vuk Ćosić and with contemporary artists Aram Bartholl, Paolo Cirio, James Powderly and Evan Roth from Free Art and Technology Lab and Graffiti Research Lab, Franco and Eva Mattes (0100101110101101.org), IRWIN, Franz West, Janez Janša, Johannes Grenzfurthner (monochrom), Carsten Nicolai, Minerva Cuevas, The Yes Men, Zhang Peili, Jodi, Miltos Manetas, Rafael Lozano-Hemmer, Trevor Paglen, Douglas Rushkoff, Lev Manovich, Olga Goriunova and Nicolas Bourriaud.

Publications

 Domenico Quaranta (ed), UBERMORGEN.COM, FPEditions, Brescia 2009
 Alessandro Ludovico (ed), UBERMORGEN.COM – MEDIA HACKING VS. CONCEPTUAL ART, Christoph Merian Verlag, Basel 2009
 Coded Cultures – New Creative Practices out of Diversity", Series: Edition Angewandte, Russegger, Georg; Tarasiewicz, Matthias; Wlodkowski, Michal (Eds.), SpringerWienNewYork Publisher, 1st Edition., 2011, 384 p. 50 illus, Softcover, p. 334–355, "From Somebody's Desire to Everyone's Responsibility", Yukiko Shikata/UBERMORGEN.COM,
 This is a magazine, Pink Laser Beam, Compendium #6, "Pink Laser Beam" Paper, Plastic, Glue, Thread, Metal-foil, Edition of 666, 2009, "Amazon Noir project"

Awards

 Swiss Art Award 2011, TORTURE CLASSICS 
 ARCO Beep Award 2009, EKMRZ-Trilogy
 IBM AWARD FOR NEW MEDIA/Stuttgarter Filmwinter, 2007, Amazon Noir
 Ars Electronica 2005, Award of Distinction for Vote-Auction
 Ars Electronica, Honorary Mentions for Injunction Generator (2003) and GWEI – Google Will Eat Itself (2005)
 Ars Electronica 1996, Golden Nica for etoy/digital hijack (Luzius Bernhard)

References and notes

External links
UBERMORGEN.COM
 Injunction Generator

Swiss contemporary artists
Internet activists
Art duos
Hacker culture
Austrian contemporary artists
Central European art groups